West Meadowlark Park is a residential neighbourhood in west Edmonton, Alberta, Canada located just east of West Edmonton Mall.  The area was originally part of the Town of Jasper Place, and became a part of Edmonton when Jasper Place amalgamated with Edmonton in 1964.

The neighbourhood is bounded on the west by 170 Street, on the east by 163 Street, on the south by 87 Avenue, and on the north by 95 Avenue.

The community is represented by the West Meadowlark Community League, established in 1965, which maintains a community hall and outdoor rink located at 165 Street and 93 Avenue.

Demographics 

Residential development 
Over 90% of the residences in the neighbourhood were built between the end of World War II and 1980, with two out of three residences being built during the 1960s.

The most common type of residence is the single-family dwelling (40%) followed by apartments (30%), row houses (18%) and duplexes (4%).  Seven out of ten residences are owner-occupied, with the remainder being rented.  In 2001 the average household size was 2.4, with six out of ten households having only one or two people.

Schools 
There are four schools located in West Meadowlark Park. Two are operated by the Edmonton Public School System and two are operated by the Edmonton Catholic School System.

Edmonton Public Schools
Afton Elementary School Of the Arts
Jasper Place High School
Edmonton Catholic Schools
Annunciation Catholic Elementary School (offers the IB Primary Years Programme)
St. Francis Xavier High School

Recreation and services 
The Edmonton's Misericordia Community Hospital is located at the southwest corner of the neighbourhood.

The Johnny Bright Sports Park, the Jasper Place Fitness and Leisure Centre, and the Bill Hunter Centre are located on the east side of the neighbourhood between Jasper Place High School and St. Francis Xavier High School. 

The City of Edmonton and the Edmonton Catholic School District are jointly developing a sports field house adjacent to St. Francis Xavier High School.  The sports facility will meet the school's instructional needs during school hours and the recreation and sport needs of the community during the day, evenings, and on weekends. It is now completed and opened as of December 2010.

Surrounding neighbourhoods 
Adjacent neighbourhoods are Glenwood, Meadowlark Park, Summerlea, Terra Losa, and Thorncliff.

See also 
 Edmonton Federation of Community Leagues

References

External links 
 West Meadowlark Community League

Neighbourhoods in Edmonton